Rolf Leslie was a British actor born in Dumfries, Dumfriesshire, Scotland, UK.

Selected filmography
 Sixty Years a Queen (1913)
 East Lynne (1913)
 Lights of London (1914)
 Jane Shore (1915)
 The Faith of a Child (1915)
 The Man Who Bought London (1916)
 Tom Brown's Schooldays (1916)
 Victory and Peace (1918)
 The Ticket-of-Leave Man (1918)
 The Beetle (1919)
 Tansy (1921)
 Sister Brown (1921)
 Dollars in Surrey (1921)
 A Romance of Old Baghdad (1922)
 The Royal Oak (1923)
 Cragmire Tower (1924)
 Nell Gwyn (1926)
 Mumsie (1927)
 The Last Post (1929)

References

External links

Date of birth unknown
Date of death unknown
Scottish male film actors
Scottish male silent film actors
People from Dumfries
20th-century Scottish male actors